Sergio van Kanten (born 2 July 1984) is a Dutch-American soccer player who last played for Miami FC in the North American Soccer League.

Professional career
Van Kanten had stints with the youth teams of Deportivo Cali, Middlesbrough, FC Volendam, Lusitano and Amora, before playing with KSV Roeselare and USL First Division side Miami FC, before leaving the game in 2007. He returned in 2015 to play with amateur side Miami Dade FC, and in 2016 signed a professional contract with NASL side Miami FC for their inaugural season. van Kanten was released by Miami FC on 10 June 2016.

References

External links
 Miami FC player profile

1984 births
Living people
American soccer players
American expatriate soccer players
Miami Dade FC players
Miami FC players
Association football midfielders
Soccer players from Florida
North American Soccer League players